Industria de Diseño Textil, S.A. (Inditex; ,) is a Spanish multinational clothing company headquartered in Arteixo, Galicia, in Spain. Inditex, the biggest fast fashion group in the world, operates over 7,200 stores in 93 markets worldwide. The company's flagship store is Zara, but it also owns a number of other brands such as Zara Home, Bershka, Massimo Dutti, Oysho, Pull&Bear, Stradivarius, Uterqüe and Lefties. The majority of its stores are corporate-owned, while franchises are mainly conceded in countries where corporate properties cannot be foreign-owned.

Inditex's business is centred around one simple premise: to be quick at responding to the market. Whereas it would take almost a year for a traditional fashion company to get its products out, from conception to runway to stores, for Inditex this process takes less than two months, to replenish stores with new and different products weekly and respond quickly. This is not without consequences on the earth and people, as it is the biggest fast fashion brand in the world. New styles are prototyped in just 5 days, and 60% of the manufacturing happens locally to shorten lead times. In Zara stores, it can take a new garment as little as 15 days to go from design and production to store shelves.

History

Early history
Amancio Ortega started in the clothing industry in the early 1960s while working for a local shirt maker in A Coruña, Spain. Ortega began developing his designs and he and his wife, Rosalia Mera, started making clothes from their home. Amancio had saved up enough money to open a small factory and sold garments to his former employer amongst others.

In 1975, the couple opened their first store, Zara, which produced popular fashion at low prices. The following year, Zara was incorporated and began opening more stores and factories in Spain. Later that year, after Ortega noticed the growing importance of computers, a local professor, José María Castellano, was hired to grow the company's computing power.

1980–2000
In the 1980s the company implemented a new design and distribution method that drastically reduced the time between design, production, and arrival at retail sites. The system was designed by Castellano who became the CEO of the company in 1984. In 1985, Industria de Diseño Textil S.A. or Inditex was created as a holding company for Zara and its manufacturing plants. In 1988, the company began expanding internationally with the opening of a Zara store in Porto, Portugal. In 1990, the company owned footwear collection, Tempe, populated in the children's section of Zara stores. In 1991, Inditex created the company Pull and Bear, a casual menswear company. Later that year, the company also acquired a 65 per cent share in the upscale Massimo Dutti brand. Inditex created Lefties in 1993; the name is taken from the term leftovers and it was created to sell old Zara clothing. In 1995, Inditex purchased the remaining Massimo Dutti shares and began expanding the brand to include a women's line. In 1998, Inditex launched the Bershka brand that was aimed at urban hip fashion. The company bought Stradivarius in 1999, a youthful female fashion brand.

2001–present
Inditex had its initial public offering (IPO) in 2001, on the Bolsa de Madrid. The IPO sold 26 per cent of the company to public investors, the company was valued at €9 billion. The same year, the company launched the lingerie and women's clothing store Oysho.

In 2003, Inditex launched the Zara Home brand, which offers bedding, cutlery, glassware and other home decoration accessories. In 2004, with the opening of store number 2,000 in Hong Kong, Inditex had established its presence in 56 countries.

In 2005, CEO Jose Maria Castellano stepped down from the position to oversee expansion plans, he was replaced by Pablo Isla. Inditex launched Uterque in the summer of 2008, the brand specializes in women's accessories. During the same year, the company opened its 4,000th store in Tokyo after doubling in size within four years. In 2011, Ortega, the founder of the business and majority shareholder, stepped down as deputy chairman and CEO Isla handles day-to-day operations. Later that year, the company opened a store in Australia, a move that would put the company on five continents and in 77 countries. After the 2013 Savar building collapse, Inditex was one of the thirty-eight companies who signed the Accord on Factory and Building Safety in Bangladesh.

As of 2019, Inditex is the biggest fashion retailer in the world by revenue.

The company's revenue fell by 18% to $1.85 billion in the final quarter of 2020, primarily due to the fall in retail sales as a result of the coronavirus pandemic. Inditex's stocks fell by 12% over the year.

In May 2021, Inditex said that all its stores in Venezuela would close as it will review its agreement with its local partner Phoenix World Trade.

International presence
In 1989, a year after entering Portugal, the company entered the U.S. market and expanded into France in 1990. Expansion continued to Mexico in 1992 and Greece in 1993. In 1994, Inditex opened stores in Belgium and Sweden. By 1997, the company had expanded to Malta, Cyprus, Norway and Israel. In 1998, expansion continued to the UK, Turkey, Argentina, Venezuela, the Middle East and Japan. Canada, Germany, Poland, Saudi Arabia and several South American countries received stores in 1999.

The company opened stores in Italy, Luxembourg and Jordan in 2001. In 2003, Inditex opened stores in Russia, Slovakia and Malaysia. The following year Latvia, Hungary, and Panama amongst other countries where stores opened, including the 2,000th store in Hong Kong. By 2006, the company had expanded into mainland China. In 2010, the company opened their 5,000th location in Rome and its first in India. The first stores in Australia and South Africa opened in 2011. The company's expansion continued to the Serbia, North Macedonia, Armenia, Ecuador, Georgia and Bosnia-Herzegovina in 2012. In 2014, Inditex opened stores in Albania. In 2016, Inditex announced that they planned to open stores in Vietnam, New Zealand, Paraguay, Aruba and Nicaragua.

Online sales
In 2007, Inditex launched the Zara Home online retail store. Zara joined the e-commerce marketplace in September 2010, launching websites in Spain, the UK, Portugal, Italy, Germany and France. In November 2010, Zara's online presence grew to include Austria, Ireland, the Netherlands, Belgium and Luxembourg. In September 2011, Inditex brought Zara's e-commerce platform to the U.S., as well as adding the brands Pull and Bear, Massimo Dutti, Bershka, Stadivarius, Oysho and Uterqüe to the e-commerce space. As of February 2016, Inditex operates e-commerce sites in 28 markets and plans to add 12 more by April. In September 2018, Inditex announced to sell all its brands online by 2020, even in places where it does not own any stores.

Marketing strategy
Inditex avoids magazine advertising, with print campaigns only occurring on billboards in certain regions like U.S. and in-store. Endorsements for celebrities to wear its labels are budgeted instead. The company also invests heavily in a prime commercial location with fashion-forward window displays for optimum high street visibility and product turnaround.

Plagiarism
Zara has been accused of copying artwork.

In 2017, Zara Home Belgium was convicted of plagiarism by a Brussels Court, which was claimed to have been the first plagiarism conviction of a fast retailer.

Brands
Under the Inditex umbrella are several brands that offer a variety of products aimed at different markets.

Corporate affairs

Board of Directors
Bold indicates a company shareholder and the representative will be listed below.

See also

References

External links
 
 

 
Clothing companies of Spain
Companies based in Galicia (Spain)
Clothing companies established in 1985
Spanish companies established in 1985
Companies in the Euro Stoxx 50
Companies listed on the Madrid Stock Exchange
IBEX 35
Multinational companies headquartered in Spain
2001 initial public offerings